Vladimir Sokolov may refer to:

 Vladimir Sokolov (musician) (1936–1999), Russian clarinettist
 Vladimir Sokolov (rower) (born 1962), Russian Olympic rower
 Vladimir Sokolov (scientist) (1928–1998), Russian environmental scientist
 Vladimir Sokolov (speedway rider), Ukrainian/Soviet Union speedway rider 
 Vladimir Samarin, the pseudonym of Russian Nazi collaborator and Yale University instructor Vladimir Sokolov

See also
 Vladimir Sokoloff (1889–1962), actor
 Vladimir Sokoloff (pianist) (1913–1997), academic